Villa Cyrnos is a Belle Époque-style villa in Roquebrune-Cap-Martin on the Côte d'Azur in Southern France. It was designed by Hans-Georg Tersling, one of the most productive architects of the period on the French Riviera.

History
The villa, named after the ancient Greek for Corsica, was built in 1892 for Eugénie de Montijo, wife of Napoleon III, Emperor of the French and the last Empress consort of the French. The former Empress wanted her own palace instead of staying with her friend Elisabeth, known as "Sisi", Empress of Austria. Elisabeth became a regular guest at the villa. Queen Victoria was another of Eugénie's friends and visited the villa annually.

In 1920, the villa was inherited by Marie-Laetitia Bonaparte who, during her widowhood, maintained a scandalous relationship with Norberto Fischer, a military man twenty years her junior. As the sole heir in her will, he inherited the house in 1926 and lived there—since his 1928 marriage, with opera singer Vina Bovy—until his death in 1950. In 1960 Bovy sold the house.

Villa Cypris
It is adjacent to Villa Cypris.

References

External links

Houses completed in 1892
Houses in Alpes-Maritimes
French Riviera
Villas in France
Belle Époque